The foureye butterflyfish (Chaetodon capistratus) is a butterflyfish (family Chaetodontidae). It is alternatively called the four-eyed butterflyfish. This species is found in the Western Atlantic from Massachusetts, USA and Bermuda to the West Indies and northern South America.

Chaetodon capistratus is the type species of Chaetodon. If this genus is split up as some have proposed, it will retain its present name like its closest relatives, which include the banded butterflyfish (C. striatus) and the spot-finned butterflyfish (C. ocellatus).

Description and ecology
Foureye butterflyfish are deep-bodied and laterally compressed, with a single dorsal fin and a small mouth with tiny, bristle like teeth. The body is light grey, sometimes with a yellowish hue, and dark forward-pointing chevrons. The ventral fins are yellow. The species gets its common name from a large dark spot on the rear portion of each side of the body. This spot is surrounded by a brilliant white ring, resembling an eye. A black vertical bar on the head runs through the true eye, making it hard to see.

This pattern may result in a predator confusing the back end of the fish for the front end. The foureye butterflyfish's first instinct when threatened is to flee, putting the false eye spot closer to the predator than the head.  Most predators aim for the eyes, and this false eye spot may in automimicry trick the predator into believing that the fish will flee tail first. Other potential functions of the eye spot exist. The eye spots are larger and more variable than the real eye and eye spot shape varies from vertically oval in young to more circular in adults. These features suggest other possible functions of the eye spot including: intimidating prey, altering predation reaction distances, disorientating predators, serving as a general warning, or for social communication. When escape is not possible, a foureye butterflyfish will sometimes turn to face its aggressor, head lowered and spines fully erect, like a bull about to charge.  This may serve to intimidate the other animal or may remind the predator that the butterflyfish is much too spiny to make a comfortable meal.

Foureye butterflyfish usually frequent shallow inshore waters, where they feed on a variety of invertebrates, mainly zoantharians, sea anemones, scleractinians, polychaete worms, gorgonians, tunicates, crustaceans and fish eggs. This fish is known for its uncanny ability to swim in and around coral heads and reefs. They are able to find their way through the most intricate passages by swimming on its side or even upside down. Like its relatives they mate for life and therefore they will often be seen in pairs. They are one of a few fish that mate for life.

Gallery

References

External links
 
 Video of Foureye Butterflyfish - Video taken in Belize off Ambergris Caye. 

foureye butterflyfish
Fish of the Eastern United States
Fish of the Caribbean
foureye butterflyfish
foureye butterflyfish